John David Long (1901–1967) was a Union County, South Carolina politician and state senator. John D. Long Lake is named for him.

Family background
The Long family was long prominent in Union County. The first John D. Long (1811–1897) was a Confederate soldier and father of James Gideon Long, who also served in the Confederate Army and later organized the Ku Klux Klan in Union County and was a sheriff for 20 years. His son, James Gideon Long Jr., had ten children, one of whom was John David Long.

Career
Long became a lawyer, and then later a state senator (D), and one of the best-known and most powerful and influential men in Union County, although also an egregious alcoholic given to two-week benders.

When in the senate, Long was involved in a 1961–1962 controversy over display of the Confederate Flag, and racial segregation at the American Civil War Centennial observances in the state capital. When President Kennedy ordered the national Centennial Commission to move its ceremonies from segregated facilities to the integrated Charleston Navy Base, the South Carolina delegation held its own, segregated, events at a downtown hotel, where Long – who had sponsored a resolution to display Confederate flags over the daises of the South Carolina House and Senate – addressed the crowd with:

Long's son, John David Long III, also became a state senator and sponsored the creation of John D. Long Lake in honor of his father. John D. Long Lake was later the scene of the Susan Smith murders.

References

1901 births
1967 deaths
People from Union County, South Carolina
South Carolina state senators
20th-century American politicians